Santiago López Garcia (born 4 December 1997) is an Argentine professional footballer who plays as a midfielder for Quilmes, on loan from Gimnasia y Esgrima.

Career
At youth level, López played for Club Banco Mendoza and Chacras de Coria. In January 2016, López moved to Israel to sign with Hapoel Afula's academy; having had a short stint with Beitar Jerusalem's. He netted nine goals in fifteen appearances in the Youth League, including hat-tricks against Ihud Bnei Baqa and Maccabi Ironi Kiryat Ata. López soon returned to his homeland, signing with Gimnasia y Esgrima. Having been an unused substitute against Olimpo on 2 December 2018, he made his professional bow during a 2–2 draw with Los Andes on 1 February 2019. In February 2022, López joined Quilmes on a loan deal for the rest of 2022.

Career statistics
.

References

External links

1997 births
Living people
Argentine footballers
Argentine expatriate footballers
Place of birth missing (living people)
Association football midfielders
Primera Nacional players
Beitar Jerusalem F.C. players
Hapoel Afula F.C. players
Gimnasia y Esgrima de Mendoza footballers
Quilmes Atlético Club footballers
Argentine expatriate sportspeople in Israel
Expatriate footballers in Israel